Lindberg is a municipality in the district of Regen in Bavaria in Germany.

Lindberg may also refer to:

 Lindberg (surname)
 Lindberg, Washington, a ghost town
 Lindberg (band), Japanese pop band
 Lindberg (album)
 Lindberg (eyewear), a glasses manufacturer

See also 
 
 Lindbergh (disambiguation)
 Lindeberg (disambiguation)
 Lindenberg (disambiguation)